The following is a list of the MTV Europe Music Award winners and nominees for Best Czech & Slovak Act.

2010s

MTV Europe Music Awards
Czech music awards
Slovak music
Awards established in 2010